Tladistad is a small village located in the Moretele subregion of the Bojanala district.

Schools
Tladistad has three schools, two of which are primary schools, and the third is a secondary school.
 Tladistad Primary School
 Marapo a Thutlwa Primary School
 Seboaneng Secondary School

References

Populated places in the Moretele Local Municipality